Jerry Ahrlin (born 15 January 1978 in Östersund, Sweden), is a Swedish cross-country skier.

Cross-country skiing results
All results are sourced from the International Ski Federation (FIS).

World Cup

Season standings

Individual podiums
 1 podium – (1 )

Trophies
 Marcialonga winner of 2007, 2009 and 2011
 Tartu Maraton winner of 2007 and 2011
 König Ludwig Lauf winner of 2013

References

External links
 FIS website  

1978 births
Living people
People from Östersund
Cross-country skiers from Jämtland County
Swedish male cross-country skiers
Brunflo IF skiers